Ouvrage Oberheid, also called Ouvrage Oberheide, forms a portion of the Fortified Sector of Thionville of the Maginot Line in northeast France. The petit ouvrage d'infanterie is located on a salient point of the Cattenom Forest between the gros ouvrages Kobenbusch (to the north) and Galgenberg (to the south), which provided covering fire during June 1940, when Oberheid faced daily bombardments and infiltrations. Oberheid has been abandoned and after extensive vandalism has been sealed.

Design and construction 
Oberheid was surveyed by CORF (Commission d'Organisation des Régions Fortifiées), the Maginot Line's design and construction agency, in 1930. and the position became operational in 1935, at a cost of 8 million francs. It was built by the contractor Verdun-Fortifications.

Description 
The single combat block has two firing chambers and a central barracks surmounted by a machine gun turret.  Each firing chamber has a mixed armament of a machine gun and a 37mm anti-tank gun at one embrasure and a machine gun at the other. The ouvrage is surmounted by a machine gun turret and four automatic rifle cloches (GFMs), which provided artillery spotting for the ouvrage Métrich.  The small usine is equipped with two  Baudouin engines.

Manning 

The ouvrage possessed a garrison of 78 men of the 168th Fortress Infantry Regiment, under the orders of Lieutenant Pobeau and his assistant, Lieutenant Sépulchre.

History
See Fortified Sector of Thionville for a broader discussion of the events of 1940 in the Thionville sector of the Maginot Line.
Oberheid did not see significant action in  the Battle of France in 1940, nor in the Lorraine Campaign of 1944. In 1940 German infiltrators occupied the surface of Oberheid, requiring suppressing fire to be directed from neighboring Kobenbusch. The Germans largely bypassed the area, advancing along the valley of the Meuse and Saar rivers, threatening the rear of the Thionville sector. The garrison therefore remained in place. Following negotiations, the positions on the left bank of the Moselle finally surrendered to the Germans on 30 June 1940.

Current condition 
The French Army continues to control Oberheid.  After extensive vandalism, the entrances have been  buried to prevent access.

See also 
 List of all works on Maginot Line
 Siegfried Line
 Atlantic Wall
 Czechoslovak border fortifications

Notes

References

Bibliography 
Allcorn, William. The Maginot Line 1928-45. Oxford: Osprey Publishing, 2003. 
Kaufmann, J.E. and Kaufmann, H.W. Fortress France: The Maginot Line and French Defenses in World War II, Stackpole Books, 2006. 
Kaufmann, J.E., Kaufmann, H.W., Jancovič-Potočnik, A. and Lang, P. The Maginot Line: History and Guide, Pen and Sword, 2011. 
Mary, Jean-Yves; Hohnadel, Alain; Sicard, Jacques. Hommes et Ouvrages de la Ligne Maginot, Tome 1. Paris, Histoire & Collections, 2001.  
Mary, Jean-Yves; Hohnadel, Alain; Sicard, Jacques. Hommes et Ouvrages de la Ligne Maginot, Tome 2. Paris, Histoire & Collections, 2003.  
Mary, Jean-Yves; Hohnadel, Alain; Sicard, Jacques. Hommes et Ouvrages de la Ligne Maginot, Tome 3. Paris, Histoire & Collections, 2003.  
Mary, Jean-Yves; Hohnadel, Alain; Sicard, Jacques. Hommes et Ouvrages de la Ligne Maginot, Tome 5. Paris, Histoire & Collections, 2009.

External links 
 Ligne Maginot de Cattenom et environs official site 
 Ligne Maginot - Petit Ouvrage Oberheid 
 Oberheid at fortiff.be 
 Ouvrage de l'Oberheide at wikimaginot.eu 
 L'ouvrage de l'Oberheid at alsacemaginot.com 
 Petit ouvrage de l'Oberheide at lignemaginot.com 

OBEr
Maginot Line